Sir Terence Arnold  (born 1947) is a judge of the Supreme Court of New Zealand. He was the Solicitor-General of New Zealand from 2000, before being made a judge of the Court of Appeal of New Zealand in 2006. He was elevated to the Supreme Court on 11 June 2013.

Career
Arnold graduated from Victoria University of Wellington with a B.A. and LL.M. and New York University with an LL.M. He taught criminal law at Victoria University of Wellington as well as at several Canadian universities, including Dalhousie University and the University of Calgary. He taught at different law schools of New Zealand and Canada in the years between 1970 and 1982. Later, in 1986, he became a monitoring and advising member for the Bill of Rights. He was a partner of Chapman Tripp Sheffield Young between 1985 and 1994. He became a barrister sole in 1994 and shortly thereafter, was appointed Queen's Counsel. He is one of the founders of the Law and Economics Association of New Zealand and became its president for a year in 1996. He also played a noticeable part in the establishment of New Zealand Law Society Litigation Skills Programme and the Civil Litigation Skills Programme. He was Solicitor-General between 2000 and 2006. He was appointed a judge of the High Court and the Court of Appeal in May 2006.  He was appointed a judge of the Supreme Court on 11 June 2013. On 12 April 2017, he retired from the permanent bench of the Supreme Court, having reached 70 years of age, but sits as a retired judge when required.

In the 2016 New Year Honours, Arnold was appointed a Knight Companion of the New Zealand Order of Merit, for services to the judiciary.

Arnold was appointed, alongside former Prime Minister Geoffrey Palmer, to the 2018 inquiry into the NZSAS murder of at least six civilians and the wounding of fifteen more in Operation Burnham. The inquiry's report found the attack on the villagers was justified.

In December 2022 he was appointed to the Cook Islands Court of Appeal.

References

External links
kiwisfirst.co.nz Profile
Press Release from Hon. Michael Cullen, Attorney General, "Appointment of Terence Arnold QC as Judge of the High Court and Court of Appeal", May 4, 2006.

Court of Appeal of New Zealand judges
High Court of New Zealand judges
Supreme Court of New Zealand judges
Victoria University of Wellington alumni
Living people
20th-century New Zealand lawyers
1953 births
New Zealand King's Counsel
Solicitors-General of New Zealand
Knights Companion of the New Zealand Order of Merit
21st-century New Zealand judges
New Zealand judges on the courts of the Cook Islands